The Pravo.ru is a Russian online media specializing in legal journalism.

The company, which owns the magazine, also is the developer of the self-titled reference legal system and carries out maintenance of electronic services of the arbitration courts.

History
The Pravo.ru was founded in 2008 by businessman Dmitriy Chirakadze and designer Aleksei Pelevin. In the absence of competition, the Pravo.ru quickly became a popular in Russian community of lawyers.

Activity
The Pravo.ru publishes news on legal subjects, legal reviews, interviews with distinguished lawyers.

Since 2010, the Pravo.ru compiles a ranking of Russian law firms in different areas of law.

In 2022, the Pravo.ru established an annual award in the field of legal marketing.

References

External links
  

Mass media companies established in 2008
Russian news websites